Lawrence Le Lam is a Canadian film and television editor. He is noted for his work on the 2019 film The World Is Bright, for which he was a Canadian Screen Award nominee for Best Editing in a Documentary at the 9th Canadian Screen Awards in 2021. He also won Best Short Film for Vancouver Short Film Festival for his film Cypher in 2018. He also received an award for Best Period Piece at Hollyshorts Film Festival in 2018.

References

External links

Canadian film editors
Living people
Year of birth missing (living people)